National Steel is a blues album by Canadian musician Colin James, released in 1997 (see 1997 in music). The album was recorded at Rat's Ass Studios and Mushroom Studios in Vancouver, British Columbia and mastered at MasterDisk in New York City.

James teamed up with his longtime friend Colin Linden to record a predominantly acoustic album running the gamut from delta blues, to jug band and Chicago blues. The album covers songs written by some of the greatest bluesmen including Otis Redding, Robert Johnson, Muddy Waters and Willie Dixon. The CD liner notes offer a brief commentary by James on many of the tracks.

The album is named after the resonator guitar made by the National guitar company, also pictured on the album's cover.

National Steel earned James the 1998 Juno Award for "Best Blues Album".

Track listing 
 "Shout Baby Shout" (Yank Rachell) – 3:15
 "Rollin' Stone"    (Muddy Waters) – 3:21
 "National Steel"   (Colin James, Daryl Burgess, Christopher Ward) – 4:52
 "These Arms of Mine" (Otis Redding) – 4:44
 "Going Up to the Country" (Taj Mahal) – 4:11
 "Fixin' to Die"       (Bukka White) – 4:28
 "Somebody Have Mercy" (Sam Cooke) – 3:32
 "Postman's Sack"      (Tiny Bradshaw) – 1:40
 "Please Baby"         (Lonnie Chatmon) – 3:41
 "Ride & Roll"         (Brownie McGhee) – 2:39
 "I Live the Life I Love" (Willie Dixon) – 3:39
 "My Mind Is On Vacation" (Mose Allison) – 3:34
 "Before the Dawn"        (Colin Linden) – 4:24
 "Kind-Hearted Woman"     (Robert Johnson) – 2:41

Personnel 
 Colin James – vocals, guitars
 Colin Linden – acoustic and slide guitars, mandolin, background vocals
 Norm Fisher – bass
 Chris "The Wrist" Norquist – drums and percussion
 Johnny Ferreira – tenor saxophone
 Campbell Ryga – alto saxophone
 James O'Mara – design, photography

External links 
 National Steel

Colin James albums
1997 albums
Juno Award for Blues Album of the Year albums